The 2015–16 Iona Gaels women's basketball team represents Iona College  during the 2015–16 NCAA Division I women's basketball season. The Iona Gaels are coached by second year head coach, Billi Godsey. They play their home games in New Rochelle, New York, at the Hynes Athletic Center, and were members of the Metro Atlantic Athletic Conference (MAAC). They finished the season 23–12, 16–4 in MAAC play to finish in second place. They were champions of the MAAC women's tournament to earn an automatic bid to the NCAA women's tournament where they lost in the first round to Maryland.

NCAA Invitation 
Iona has reached the conference championship game three times in the last decade. Each time, Marist prevailed, thwarting the Gales bid to in a conference championship and an invitation to the NCAA tournament. This year, Iona didn’t face Marist, but faced Quinnipiac, a team who had defeated them twice in the regular-season. The third time, the result would be different — Iona opened up a 10-point lead at halftime and extended it in the second half to win 57–41 to earn their first ever invitation to the NCAA tournament.

Roster

Schedule
Source:

|-
!colspan=9 style="background:#712D3E; color:#FDB913;"| Regular Season

|-
!colspan=9 style="background:#712D3E; color:#FDB913;"| MAAC Women's Tournament

|-
!colspan=9 style="background:#712D3E; color:#FDB913;"| NCAA Women's Tournament

See also
 2015–16 Iona Gaels men's basketball team

References 

Iona Gaels women's basketball
Iona
Iona